Berni Julian Alder (September 9, 1925 – September 7, 2020) was a German-born American physicist specialized in statistical mechanics, and a pioneer of computational modelling of matter.

Biography 
Alder was born in Duisburg, Prussia, in September 1925, to Jewish parents, a chemist and a homemaker. After the Nazis came to power, the family moved to Zurich, Switzerland. Fearing an invasion by Nazi Germany after the outbreak of World War II, the family applied for a visa to the United States, which was granted in 1941. They left by sealed train from neutral Switzerland to (formally neutral) Spain, then to Portugal, where they took a ship to the US. Following a stint in the US Navy after US entry into the war, he obtained a BSc in chemistry from the University of California at Berkeley and a master's degree in chemical engineering from the same institution in 1947. He went to the California Institute of Technology to study under John Gamble Kirkwood for his PhD in 1948 and worked for the investigation of phase transitions in hard-sphere gas with Stan Frankel, where he got the idea to use the Monte Carlo method. After he finished at Caltech in 1952, he went to Berkeley and worked part-time at Berkeley to teach chemistry and part-time as a consultant under the suggestion of Edward Teller in the nuclear weapons program for the Lawrence Livermore National Laboratory to help with the equations of state. In collaboration with Thomas Everett Wainwright, and Mary Ann Mansigh, he developed techniques for molecular dynamics simulation in the mid-1950s, including the liquid-solid phase transition for hard sphere and the velocity autocorrelations function decay in liquids.

Alder, along with Teller, was one of the founders of the Department of Applied Science in 1963.  He was a professor of Applied Science at the University of California at Davis, and later professor emeritus.

In 2001, he was awarded the Boltzmann Medal for inventing technique of molecular dynamics simulation.

He was elected a Fellow of the American Academy of Arts and Sciences in 2008. In 2009, he was awarded the National Medal of Science.

Alder was a Guggenheim Fellow. He was the editor of the book series Methods in Computational Physics and the founder of the magazine Computing.

Alder died on September 7, 2020, of heart failure.

References

External links 
 An Interview with Bernie Alder by George Michael, Stories of the Development of Large Scale Scientific Computing at Lawrence Livermore National Laboratory
 Berni J. Alder CECAM Prize
 Oral History interview transcript for Berni Alder on 18 June 1990, American Institute of Physics, Niels Bohr Library and Archives

1925 births
2020 deaths
21st-century American physicists
American people of German-Jewish descent
California Institute of Technology alumni
Fellows of the American Academy of Arts and Sciences
Fellows of the American Physical Society
Jewish emigrants from Nazi Germany to the United States
Lawrence Livermore National Laboratory staff
Members of the United States National Academy of Sciences
National Medal of Science laureates
Scientific computing researchers
UC Berkeley College of Chemistry alumni
University of California, Berkeley College of Letters and Science faculty
University of California, Davis faculty
German emigrants to Switzerland